Beverly Mills Vincent (March 28, 1890 – August 15, 1980) was a U.S. representative from Kentucky.

He was born in Brownsville, Edmonson County, Kentucky, March 28, 1890; attended the public schools, Western Kentucky State Teachers College at Bowling Green, and the law department of the University of Kentucky at Lexington; was admitted to the bar in 1915 and commenced practice in Brownsville, Kentucky. He was county judge of Edmonson County, Kentucky from 1916 to 1918.

During the First World War he served as a private in Battery A, 72nd Field Artillery Regiment at Camp Knox, Kentucky, from August 27, 1918, to January 9, 1919.

He was assistant attorney general of Kentucky in 1919 and 1920; member of the Kentucky Senate 1929–1933; presidential elector on the Democratic ticket in 1932; and attorney general of Kentucky from 1936 until his resignation in March 1937.

He was elected as a Democrat to the Seventy-fifth Congress by special election, to fill the vacancy caused by the death of United States Representative Glover H. Cary, and reelected to the three succeeding Congresses (March 2, 1937 – January 3, 1945).

In 1940, Congressman Vincent struck Congressman Martin Sweeney on the floor of the U.S. House of Representatives as the House debated conscription during World War II. Sweeney opposed the draft bill; Vincent called him a "traitor", which led to the fistfight.  As quoted in Time magazine "ancient Doorkeeper Joseph Sinnot [who favored the draft] said it was the best blow he had heard in his 50 years in the House."

He was not a candidate for renomination for the Seventy-ninth Congress in 1944; pursued agricultural interests, and resumed the practice of law; was a resident of Brownsville, Kentucky, until his death there on August 15, 1980.

References

External links

1890 births
1980 deaths
Farmers from Kentucky
American prosecutors
Kentucky Attorneys General
Kentucky lawyers
Kentucky state court judges
Democratic Party Kentucky state senators
University of Kentucky alumni
University of Kentucky College of Law alumni
Western Kentucky University alumni
People from Brownsville, Kentucky
Democratic Party members of the United States House of Representatives from Kentucky
20th-century American judges
20th-century American politicians
20th-century American lawyers